Adnan "Sulehri" Ilyas (born December 30, 1984) is a Pakistani-born cricketer who plays for the Oman national cricket team. He has previously played for the Oman Under-17s and now plays for the senior Omani cricket team.

In international youth cricket, Ilyas has made scores of 199 not out v Malaysia U17 and 168 not out v Hong Kong U19s. Oman qualified for the 2005 ICC Trophy, and Ilyas was selected in the squad, scoring a hundred in a warm-up win over Denmark in Belfast. However, in six games as an opener in the main tournament, Ilyas made 49 runs in six innings as opener, and only when he was relegated to batting at number three against Canada did he make 31.

Ilyas remains in the side, and played three games during the 2006 ACC Trophy, where Oman were knocked out at the group stage after a loss to Bahrain in the final game. In the Bahrain game, Oman were set 284 and Ilyas scored 18 as opener, out of a total of 264.

He made his Twenty20 International debut for Oman against Hong Kong on 21 November 2015.

References

External links
Adnan Ilyas at Cricinfo

1984 births
Living people
Omani cricketers
Oman Twenty20 International cricketers
People from Narowal District
Pakistani emigrants to Oman
Pakistani expatriates in Oman